Eurybia eryngiifolia, commonly known as the thistleleaf aster or coyote-thistle aster, is an herbaceous perennial in the family Asteraceae. It is native to the eastern United States where it is only present along the Florida panhandle and the nearby areas of southern Alabama and southwestern Georgia.

References

Flora of the Southeastern United States
eryngiifolia
Plants described in 1843